X Factor is a Brazilian reality television music competition show created by Simon Cowell and produced by FremantleMedia and Syco Entertainment, which airs on Band, with reruns airing the following day on TNT. The series premiered on August 29, 2016.

A second season was announced on 2017, but was canceled on the same year.  As of June 2022, it is unknown if a second season will be reconsidered.

Production
Based on the original UK show, and an addition to The X Factor franchise, the series found new singing talent (solo artists and groups ages 16 and over), drawn from public auditions, and they competed against each other for votes.

The winner was determined by the show's viewers via telephone, the Internet, and SMS text voting, and was awarded a recording contract with Sony Music Brasil.

The original judging panel consisted of Rick Bonadio, Alinne Rosa, Di Ferrero and Paulo Miklos, with Fernanda Paes Leme as main host and Mauricio Meirelles as social media correspondent.

In November 2016, it was confirmed that the programme would be returning for a second season, airing in 2017. However, it was later cancelled in July 2017.

Format

Categories
The show is primarily concerned with identifying singing talent, though appearance, personality, stage presence and dance routines are also an important element of many performances. Each judge is assigned one of four categories: "Boys" (aged 16–24 males), "Girls" (aged 16–24 females), "Over 25s" (solo acts aged 25 and over), and "Groups" (including duos). Through the live shows, the judges act as mentors to their category, helping to decide song choices, styling and staging, while judging contestants from other categories.

Stages
There are five stages to the competition:
 Stage 1: Producers' auditions (these auditions decide who will sing in front of the judges)
 Stage 2: Judges' auditions
 Stage 3: Boot camp
 Stage 4: Four-chair challenge
 Stage 5: Live shows (finals)

Series overview
 Contestant in (or mentor of) "Boys" category
 Contestant in (or mentor of) "Girls" category
 Contestant in (or mentor of) "Over 25s" category
 Contestant in (or mentor of) "Groups" category

Judges and hosts

Judges

Hosts

Judges' categories and their contestants
Each judge is allocated a category to mentor and chooses four acts to progress to the live finals. This table shows, for each season, which category each judge was allocated and which acts he or she put through to the live finals.

 – Winning judge/category. Winners are in bold, eliminated contestants in small font.

Ratings

References

External links
 
X Factor on Band.com.br

Brazil
Brazilian television series
2016 Brazilian television series debuts
2016 Brazilian television series endings
Rede Bandeirantes original programming
Brazilian television series based on British television series